Karl Rudolf Stehlin (13 January 1831, in Basel – 12 July 1881) was a Swiss politician and President of the Swiss Council of States (1879/1880).

He was the son of Johann Jakob Stehlin (1803–1879).

External links 
 
 

1831 births
1881 deaths
Politicians from Basel-Stadt
Swiss Calvinist and Reformed Christians
Members of the Council of States (Switzerland)
Presidents of the Council of States (Switzerland)